Castile Creek is a stream in Buchanan, Clinton and DeKalb counties the U.S. state of Missouri. It is a tributary of the Platte River.

Castile Creek has the name of William Castile, a pioneer citizen.

See also
List of rivers of Missouri

References

Rivers of Buchanan County, Missouri
Rivers of Clinton County, Missouri
Rivers of DeKalb County, Missouri
Rivers of Missouri